Wood County Courthouse may refer to:

Wood County Courthouse (West Virginia), Parkersburg, West Virginia
Wood County Courthouse and Jail, Bowling Green, Ohio
Wood County Courthouse (Wisconsin), Wisconsin Rapids, Wisconsin, listed on the National Register of Historic Places